The Assis Basket is a male professional basketball team that is based in Brazil. The club has played in the top-tier level league in Brazil, the NBB.

Honors and titles

Regional
 São Paulo State Championship 
 Runners-up (1): 2006

References

External links
Latinbasket.com team Profile

Basketball teams established in 2002
Basketball teams in Brazil
Novo Basquete Brasil
Basketball in São Paulo (state)